K2 is a residential tower block in Leeds, UK. The building is situated in the city centre, on Albion Street and Great George Street, opposite St John's Centre. The lower two floors contain commercial premises, including a Jongleurs Comedy Club, Bar Risa (a bar with a capacity of 1500) and formerly a Hard Rock Cafe. The building is the joint 9th tallest building in Leeds. The commercial parts of the building are known as 'The Cube'. Ventura Outsourcing have  of office space in the upper floors of 'The Cube'.

History 
The building was originally built in 1972, as Dudley House, an office block occupied by Leeds City Council, however by the early 2000s, the building had been vacated and was looking tired.  It was decided that it would better provide city centre flats.  It was reclad and renamed K2.

References

See also
 List of tallest buildings in Leeds
 Dudley House (Picture) 

Buildings and structures in Leeds
Apartment buildings in England